Bakhtybayevo (Baxtıbay) is a rural locality (a selo) and the administrative centre of Bakhtybayevsky Selsoviet, Birsky District, Bashkortostan, Russia. The population was 887 as of 2010. There are 9 streets.

Geography 
Bakhtybayevo is located 24 km north of Birsk (the district's administrative centre) by road. Novokulchubayevo is the nearest rural locality.

References 

Rural localities in Birsky District